This article contains information about the literary events and publications of 1541.

Events
Late August – Siege of Buda: Ottoman Bektashi dervish poet Gül Baba, companion of Sultan Suleiman the Magnificent, believed killed or died during or immediately after the Ottoman relief of Buda.
Elia Levita's chivalric romance, the Bovo-Bukh, is first printed, the earliest published secular work in Yiddish.
unknown dates
The Gustav Vasa Bible, the first official translation of the entire Bible into Swedish, Biblia, Thet är All then Helgha Scrifft på Swensko, is published in Upsala.
The first complete translation of the New Testament into Hungarian, Újszövetség, is the first book printed in Hungary, at Sárvár.
John Calvin translates his Institutio Christianae religionis into French as L'Institution chrétienne.

New books

Prose
George Buchanan
Baptistes
Jephtha
Joachim Sterck van Ringelbergh –

Drama
Lodovico Dolce – Il ragazzo
Giovanni Battista Giraldi – Orbecche

Poetry

 Anonymous – The Schole House of Women
Francesco Berni (died 1535) – Orlando innamorato
Jacques Pelletier du Mans – Ars Poetica (translation into French from Latin of Horace)

Births
January 26 – Florent Chrestien, French satirist and Latin poet (died 1596)

Deaths
April 24 – Celio Calcagnini, Ferraran polymath and Latin poet (born 1479)
August
Gül Baba, Ottoman Bektashi dervish poet (birthdate unknown)
Juan de Valdés, Spanish religious writer (born 1500)
unknown date – Giovanni Guidiccioni, Italian bishop and poet (born 1480)

References

1541

1541 books
 
Renaissance literature
Early Modern literature
Years of the 16th century in literature